Elizabeth Rood is an American diplomat who served as the chargée d'affaires of the U.S. mission to Russia from 2022 to 2023, and is the nominee to serve as the United States ambassador to Turkmenistan.

Early life and education
Rood obtained an Master of Arts from the University of Maryland and an Bachelor of Arts from Randolph-Macon Woman’s College.

Career

Rood joined the United States Foreign Service in 1993, after being a teacher in Frederick County, Maryland. Rood is a career member of the Senior Foreign Service with the rank of Minister-Counselor. She currently serves as the deputy chief of mission at the United States Embassy in Moscow, Russia. As of September 4, 2022, Rood assumed duties as chargée d'affaires of the U.S. mission to Russia due to the retirement of Ambassador John Sullivan, until a permanent successor is appointed. Before this assignment, she was a faculty advisor at the U.S. Army War College. She served as deputy chief of mission at the U.S. embassy in Tbilisi, Georgia; Rood also served as chargée d'affaires, ad interim there. Before this, she served as political counselor at the U.S. embassy in Kabul, Afghanistan. Rood had also directed several bureaus in the State Department, including the Office of Export Control Cooperation in the Bureau of International Security and Nonproliferation, the Office of Caucasus Affairs and Regional Conflicts in the Bureau of European and Eurasian Affairs, and the Foreign Service Institute’s Stability Operations Division. Rood had also served as Principal Officer at the U.S. Consulate General in Peshawar, Pakistan. Rood has other experiences in conflicts, including serving as the State Department’s representative on the U.S. Provincial Reconstruction Team in Paktika Province in Afghanistan, as well as deputy to the U.S. Special Negotiator for conflicts concerning Nagorno-Karabakh, Abkhazia, South Ossetia, and Transnistria. Other assignments include the Nonproliferation Bureau within the United States Department of State; the U.S. Mission to the International Organizations in Vienna, Austria; and the U.S. Consulate General in Düsseldorf, Germany. She also held various roles in U.S. embassies in Vienna and Moscow.

Nomination as ambassador to Turkmenistan
On August 3, 2022, President Joe Biden nominated Rood to be the next ambassador to Turkmenistan. Her nomination expired at the end of the year and was returned to Biden on January 3, 2023.

Rood was renominated the same day. Her nomination is pending before the Senate Foreign Relations Committee.

Awards and recognition
Rood is the recipient of numerous State Department performance awards, including three Senior Foreign Service Performance Awards.

Personal life
A native of North Carolina, Rood speaks French, Russian, German, Pashto, Dari, and Georgian.

References

Living people
American diplomats
Randolph College alumni
United States Department of State officials
United States Foreign Service personnel
University System of Maryland alumni
Year of birth missing (living people)
American women diplomats